Al-Sultan Keimi Kalaminjaa Siri Madheenee Suvara Maha Radun (Dhivehi: އައްސުލްޠާން ކެއިމި ކަލަމިންޖާ ސިރީ މަދީނީ ސުވަރަ މަހާރަދުން) was the Sultan of Maldives from 1268 to 1269. He was the 12 sultan to ascend the throne of Maldives from the Lunar dynasty. He was also the son of Aidage Maavaa Kilege (Dhivehi: އައިދަގެ މާވާކިލެގެ) daughter of Fathahiriya Maavaa Kilege (Dhivehi: ފަތަހިރިޔާ މާވާކިލެގެ).

References 

1269 deaths
Year of birth unknown
13th-century sultans of the Maldives